Nenad "Ćeća" Bijedić (Turkish: Nejat Biyediç or Nejat Vardar; 24 September 1959 – 15 August 2011) was a Bosnian and naturalized Turkish football manager and player. He began playing football in FK Velez Mostar.

Playing career

Club
Bijedić arrived at Bursaspor at the age of 27.  He scored 17 goals in 1987–88 season, resulting in him being nicknamed İmparator ("Emperor") by the fans and making him the most prolific striker in the team's history, scoring the most goals in a season until then.

Managerial career
He worked for Bursaspor, Karşıyaka S.K., Adanaspor, Konyaspor, Karabükspor, Diyarbakırspor, Sakaryaspor, Eskişehirspor  as a coach.

Personal life
Bijedić was born in Mostar, the second of three children. He studied economics.

Death
On 15 August 2011, Biyediç died of leukemia in Mostar, his hometown, just 10 days after he arrived from Turkey following a long-term treatment.

References

External links
 
 Stats in Yugoslavia at Zerodic
 

1959 births
2011 deaths
Sportspeople from Mostar
Association football midfielders
Bosnia and Herzegovina footballers
Yugoslav footballers
FK Velež Mostar players
Bursaspor footballers
Yugoslav First League players
Süper Lig players
Yugoslav expatriate footballers
Expatriate footballers in Turkey
Yugoslav expatriate sportspeople in Turkey
Bosnia and Herzegovina football managers
Bursaspor managers
Karşıyaka S.K. managers
Kardemir Karabükspor managers
Adanaspor managers
Konyaspor managers
Diyarbakırspor managers
Sakaryaspor managers
Eskişehirspor managers
Bosnia and Herzegovina expatriate football managers
Expatriate football managers in Turkey
Bosnia and Herzegovina expatriate sportspeople in Turkey
Deaths from leukemia
Deaths from cancer in Bosnia and Herzegovina